Bachman–Turner Overdrive, often abbreviated BTO, were a Canadian rock band from Winnipeg, Manitoba, founded by Randy Bachman, Robbie Bachman and Fred Turner in 1973. Their 1970s catalogue included five top-40 albums and six US top-40 singles (11 in Canada). BTO has five certified gold albums and one certified platinum album in the US; in Canada, they have six certified platinum albums and one certified gold album. The band has sold nearly 30 million albums worldwide, and has fans affectionately known as "gearheads" (derived from the band's gear-shaped logo). Many of their songs, including "Let It Ride", "You Ain't Seen Nothing Yet", "Takin' Care of Business", "Hey You", and "Roll on Down the Highway", still receive regular play on classic-rock stations.

The original lineup consisted of Randy Bachman (lead guitar, lead vocals), Fred Turner (bass guitar, lead vocals), Tim Bachman (guitar, vocals) and Robbie Bachman (drums). This lineup released two albums in 1973. The second and most commercially successful lineup featured Blair Thornton (lead guitar), in place of Tim Bachman. This lineup released four albums between 1974 and 1977, including two that reached the top 5 in the U.S. pop charts, as well as the band's only U.S. No. 1 single ("You Ain't Seen Nothing Yet"). Subsequent lineups enjoyed only moderate success.

After the band went into a hiatus in 2005, Randy Bachman and Fred Turner reunited in 2009 to tour and collaborate on a new album. In 2010, they played the halftime show at the Grey Cup in Edmonton. The two stopped touring following Turner's amicable retirement in March 2018.

On March 29, 2014, the classic Not Fragile line-up reunited for the first time since 1991 to mark Bachman–Turner Overdrive's induction into the Canadian Music Hall of Fame, and participated in a tribute performance of "Taking Care of Business". On January 12, 2023, drummer and co-founder Robbie Bachman died at age 69.

History

Early history 1971–1973
After finding success with The Guess Who, Randy Bachman shockingly left at the height of the group's popularity in 1970, citing health issues and lifestyle differences with the other band members. He recalled being labelled "a lunatic and a loser" and that "nobody wanted to work with me." The exception was Chad Allan, former Guess Who lead singer who had left that band four years before Randy. The two agreed to explore a musical project, and Randy then turned to family. The result was the band Brave Belt, formed in Winnipeg in 1971 with the additions of Randy's brother Robin "Robbie" Bachman on drums, and Gary Bachman acting as band manager. Brave Belt's self-titled first album, which saw Randy playing both lead guitar and bass, did not sell particularly well. The record label still wanted Brave Belt to tour, so Randy (at the suggestion of Neil Young) hired fellow Winnipeg bassist/vocalist C. F. ("Fred") Turner to perform in the band's scheduled gigs.

Turner was soon asked to be a full-time member and sing lead for the recording of Brave Belt II in 1972. Chad Allan appeared as a vocalist on two Brave Belt II songs, but left the band shortly after the album's recording. During the tour to support this album, another Bachman sibling, Tim Bachman, was added as a second guitarist because the band had felt their three-piece arrangement was too restrictive. Brave Belt II also failed to achieve any notable chart success, and in mid-1972 their supporting tour was cancelled halfway through. But Turner's influence had started to make itself felt, as he composed five songs for the Brave Belt II album and sang lead on nine of the album's eleven songs. Brave Belt II had a harder, more guitar-heavy sound than its predecessor, complemented by Turner's throaty, powerful voice.

According to Randy Bachman's autobiography, Bachman–Turner Overdrive were formed at a university gig in Thunder Bay, Ontario, shortly after Allan's departure. A promoter, disheartened with reactions to Allan's country-flavoured songs, which the band was still playing, decided to sack Brave Belt for the Saturday night show and bring in a more rock-oriented replacement from Toronto. When that didn't materialize, he begged Brave Belt to stay on and play a set of classic rock cover songs. As the band played songs like "Proud Mary", "Brown Sugar" and "All Right Now", the dance floor filled up and, according to Randy, "We instantly saw the difference between playing sit-down music people could talk over and playing music they would jump out of their seats and dance to."

After Reprise Records dropped Brave Belt from their label, Randy Bachman emptied his own bank account to finance another set of recordings with the Brave Belt II lineup, and began to shop around the next album. Said Randy in 1974, "I went to A&M, Epic, Atlantic, Columbia, Asylum – you name it. A week later, I'd get letters saying 'Dear Randy, We pass.' We're thinking of calling our greatest hits album We Pass and printing all those refusals on the jacket. I've got all 22 of them."

The band eventually landed a deal with Mercury Records, one which Randy proclaimed as a pure stroke of luck. In April 1973, Charlie Fach of Mercury Records returned to his office after a trip to France to find a stack of unplayed demo tapes waiting on his desk. Wanting to start completely fresh, he took a trash can and slid all the tapes into it except one which missed the can and fell onto the floor. Fach picked up the tape and noticed Bachman's name on it. He remembered talking to him the previous year and had told Bachman that if he ever put a demo together to send it to him. Coincidentally, Mercury had just lost Uriah Heep and Rod Stewart to other labels, and Fach was looking for new rock acts to replace them. Fach called Bachman, and Randy describes the conversation from there:

At this point the band's demo tape was still called Brave Belt III. Fach convinced the band that a brand new name was needed; one that capitalized on the name recognition of the band members. The band had already mulled over using their surnames (à la Crosby, Stills, Nash & Young). While on their way back from a gig in Toronto, the group had spotted a copy of a trucker's magazine called Overdrive while dining at the Colonial Steak House in Windsor, Ontario, run by Colonial Jim Lambros. After this, Turner wrote "Bachman–Turner Overdrive" and the initials "B.T.O." on a napkin. The rest of the band decided the addition of "Overdrive" was the perfect way to describe their music.

BTO released their eponymous first album in May 1973. The album broke through in the US via border towns such as Detroit and Buffalo and stayed on the charts for many weeks despite lacking a hit single.  The Turner-penned "Blue Collar" reached No. 21 on the Canadian RPM charts, but stalled at No. 68 on the US charts. The album's eventual success was very much the result of the band's relentless touring. Reportedly, Fach had agreed to put this album on the Mercury label only if the band would promote it with a heavy concert schedule. Wherever the band was getting significant airplay, Bachman–Turner Overdrive immediately travelled there, regardless of the tour routing, to build momentum.

One such opportunity occurred in St. Louis, Missouri. Fred Turner said, "We got a call from radio station KSHE that was putting on a benefit. They wanted a band to headline that nobody heard of because the headline acts they had booked got bigger offers and weren't coming. We had the BTO I album out then, so they at least had something to play and make it look like we were big. They started playing our record every hour, every cut off the album, across six states – 150,000 watts. The record company called and said, 'What the hell's happening? We shipped ten thousand records to St. Louis in one week!' We got there and it was an outdoor drive-in theatre, fifteen to twenty thousand people. The region had been saturated with our album. They didn't know we were Canadian, they just knew the songs. It was incredible."

Backed by manager Bruce Allen, the band logged over 300 dates in its first year of existence, and it paid off. BTO I would later be certified gold in 1974 by the Recording Industry Association of America.

Breakthrough and success 1973–1976
BTO's second album, Bachman–Turner Overdrive II, was released in December 1973 and became an enormous hit in the US (peaking at No. 4 in 1974) and their native Canada (peaking at No. 6 on the RPM albums chart). It was originally to be titled "Adrenaline Rush". It also yielded two of their best-known hit singles, "Let It Ride" and "Takin' Care of Business".  While "Let It Ride" was BTO's first Top 40 hit in the U.S. (peaking at No. 23), "Takin' Care of Business" would become one of the band's most enduring anthems. Randy had already written the core of "Takin' Care of Business" several years earlier as "White Collar Worker" while in The Guess Who, but that band had felt it was not their type of song. It reappeared in BTO's repertoire during the supporting gigs for the first album primarily, as Randy put it, "To give Fred Turner a chance to rest his voice." Randy had heard DJ Daryl Burlingham say the day before a gig, "We're takin' care of business on CFUN radio", and he decided to insert the lyrics "takin' care of business" into the chorus where "white collar worker" previously existed.

Tim Bachman left the band in early 1974 shortly after the release of Bachman–Turner Overdrive II. Randy Bachman had very strong religious beliefs and established rules to be in BTO. Among them was a rule that drugs, alcohol and premarital sex were prohibited on tour, and Tim is alleged to have broken all of these. It is said that he was given opportunities to change his lifestyle and did, at least temporarily. Said Randy in a 1974 Rolling Stone interview: "I know from experience what can ruin a good thing. Drugs made the guys in The Guess Who change. They got sloppy. They ruined themselves and their marriages." Some other accounts state that Tim left because he wanted to study record engineering and concert promotion. Tim himself lamented that during a months-long stretch on the road, he was only able to see his infant son a total of three days. In a 2002 interview, brother Robbie said, "He was basically asked to leave. He wasn't BTO caliber [and] it was difficult to rely on him. I guess the band was conflicting with his whole life."

BTO continued a very busy tour schedule and during the supporting tour for BTO II, Tim was replaced by Blair Thornton. Thornton had been in the Vancouver-based band Crosstown Bus, which released one album on MCA records. In September 1974, the first BTO album with the modified line-up, Not Fragile (a play on the hit album Fragile by Yes), was released. It became a huge success, reaching No. 1 on both the Canadian and US album charts. It included the No. 1 single "You Ain't Seen Nothing Yet" and AOR favourite "Roll on Down the Highway". Not Fragile remains BTO's top-selling non-compilation album, selling over eight million copies to date.

1975 found the band engaged in highly successful tours of Europe and the US, wherein BTO was supported by Thin Lizzy, an emerging band also on the Mercury Records label. Said Randy, "Lizzy were just opening in England, but our label wanted to bust them in the rest of Europe and break them wide open in the States, so we toured with Phil and the boys for seven or eight months." With management pressure to capitalize on their growing success, BTO quickly recorded Four Wheel Drive in May 1975, which included the single "Hey You". Although reaching no higher than No. 21 on the US charts, "Hey You" would become BTO's second No. 1 single on the Canadian RPM charts. Meanwhile, the album charted in the Top Five in both the US and Canada.

Following a cross-Canada tour in the summer of 1975, which garnered caustic comments from the Canadian press as BTO had spent most of the last 18 months in the US, the band members were already developing songs for the next album. BTO went on to record Head On, releasing it in December 1975. This album produced the 1976 Top 40 single "Take It Like a Man", which featured a guest appearance by Little Richard who wailed away on his piano. Head On also featured the jazzy Randy Bachman composition "Lookin' Out for No. 1", which reached No. 15 on the Adult Contemporary chart. While garnering some airplay on traditional rock stations, it also received fairly heavy rotation on soft rock stations which normally did not play bands like BTO. In between the latter two albums, BTO released their only non-album single "Down to the Line". This song would appear on some of the later compilation CDs, as well as on re-issues of the Head On album in CD format. Head On would be the last BTO studio album to chart in the US Top 40, peaking at No. 23 in early 1976, while also climbing to No. 3 in Canada.

The first BTO compilation album, Best of B.T.O. (So Far), was released in 1976 and featured songs from each of the band's first five studio albums. A single—a re-release of "Gimme Your Money Please"—was put out from this album, and it also charted well keeping BTO on both the AM & FM airwaves. Although peaking at only No. 19 on the charts, this compilation album became the best-selling Bachman–Turner Overdrive album to date, reaching Double Platinum status in the US.

Randy's departure and the new "BTO" 1977–1979

Freeways, BTO's sixth studio album that was recorded in late 1976 and released in February 1977, signalled the end of BTO's most successful line-up. Facing some criticism for the "sameness" of the band's songs on the two follow-up albums to Not Fragile, Randy Bachman wanted to update BTO's sound, including adding horns and strings on some songs, but the rest of the band seemed to disagree. Said Fred Turner:

Years later, Randy seemed to agree with Turner, stating, "Looking at it now, we should have taken four, five, six months off ... live a little, and then come back together with new ideas. In retrospect, that's what a lot of great bands do. And we didn't." Freeways only reached #70 on the US pop albums chart and had no charting singles.

Randy Bachman left the group following Freeways. His initial intention was to temporarily disband while he worked on a solo project, "But it was decided by management it wouldn't work." He conceded, "We also ran out of common interests." Robbie Bachman noted that the band had scheduled a meeting wherein he, Fred and Blair were going to discuss getting back to their rock and roll roots following the relative failure of Freeways. Randy then shocked the rest by saying he was leaving, despite the fact that BTO was still under contract with Mercury to release two more albums over the next 18 months.

Randy was replaced by bassist Jim Clench, formerly of April Wine. Bassist Turner moved to rhythm guitar with Thornton becoming the primary lead guitarist. Clench and Turner shared lead vocal duties. Even though this line-up included drummer Robbie Bachman, the band had to record and tour only as "BTO" because of an agreement with Randy who wanted to retain the rights to his surname for his solo career. While Randy kept the rights to the full Bachman name, the remaining band members bought the rights to "BTO" and its trademarks, including the gear logo. The re-structured BTO released Street Action in February 1978. The album became a commercial failure, missing the Top 100 on the US album charts and spawning no hit singles.

The band also released Rock n' Roll Nights in March 1979. It was the first BTO album to prominently feature outside songwriters, particularly Prism's Jim Vallance, who also co-produced the album. Vallance had taken over as main producer after Barry Mraz was fired by the band, and would later score huge success in the 80s with Bryan Adams. But like its predecessor, Rock n' Roll Nights also sold poorly (an estimated 350,000 copies worldwide). The album did, however, produce a moderately successful single called "Heartaches". Written by Turner, it cracked the Top 40 in Canada and reached number 60 on the US charts, making it the first BTO single in three years to chart in the US. BTO played this song on American Bandstand in February 1979 (with producer Vallance guesting on piano), along with another single from the same album called "Jamaica". Fred Turner and Jim Clench also appeared on Bryan Adams debut album in 1980 as session musicians. (Adams had written one song, "Wastin' Time", for BTO's Rock n' Roll Nights album; Adams' own version of the song would appear a year later on his debut album.)

On November 3, 2010, Jim Clench died at age 61 in a Montreal hospital after a battle with stage-four lung cancer.

Disbandment, side projects, and reunions 1979–1991

BTO completed a relatively successful 80-date Rock n' Roll Nights tour through late 1979, and officially disbanded in early 1980. After Randy recorded the solo album Survivor in 1978, he went on to form the short-lived Ironhorse in 1979. Ironhorse released two albums, Ironhorse and Everything Is Grey, before disbanding. Tom Sparks was the vocalist for the first Ironhorse album, along with Randy, but was replaced by Frank Ludwig for the second album in 1980. Sparks reportedly did not like the constant touring and being away from home for such long amounts of time. A reformed version of Ironhorse, renamed as "Union", released one album in 1981 entitled On Strike. Fred Turner was a member of Union along with Randy. The album sold poorly, as Randy was wrapped up in a bitter divorce and custody battle and thus unable to tour to support the release.

BTO reunited in 1983. Their line-up for their first studio LP in five years (released in 1984) consisted of Randy and Tim Bachman, Fred Turner, and former Guess Who drummer Garry Peterson, who were joined by Billy Chapman, their drum tech, on piano and keyboards. Younger brother Robbie Bachman declined to participate after business and trademark disagreements with Randy and the others:

In Randy's 2000 autobiography, Takin' Care of Business, he counters that Robbie declined to participate in the reunion when he and Fred refused to share in the publishing royalties of the hit BTO songs Randy and Fred authored.

The new album, simply (and confusingly) titled Bachman–Turner Overdrive, was released in September 1984 on Charlie Fach's new Compleat label. "For the Weekend", a song from this album, was released as a single and had a companion music video. It dented the US charts at No. 83, making it the first chart appearance by a BTO song in five years, and also the last.

In 1986, they released a live album culled from their 1985 tour called Live! Live! Live! which featured two new tracks, "Bad News Travels Fast" and "Fragile Man". The latter was actually a studio recording with the audience sound added to it. A studio version of "Bad News Travels Fast" was released on the soundtrack for the movie Body Slam. They were the opening band for the new Sammy Hagar-fronted Van Halen on their 5150 tour in 1986. This plum opening slot was done by a trio line-up of Randy, Tim and Garry Peterson (allegedly with some bass parts and Fred's voice provided via tapes) since Fred Turner had been unavailable when the group was first contacted by Van Halen's management. Chapman later stepped in as drummer for Peterson after the latter severely injured his leg while playing softball during the group's downtime on the road.

After the Van Halen tour ended, Randy split and Tim kept going briefly as BTO. The others reluctantly gave him permission to do so to get his way out of debt. Billy Chapman later became the drummer for Randy Bachman's band and drummed on Randy's 1993 solo album Any Road.

In 1988, the 1974–77 Not Fragile line-up (Randy, Fred, Blair, Robbie) reformed once again, took to the road and recorded an unknown number of songs together. The only song to make it out into the public by this version of the band was a cover of the song "Wooly Bully", which is only available on the American Boyfriends movie soundtrack. But by late 1991, Randy Bachman had left the group again. Two explanations exist for this happening. The first, according to Randy Bachman, was that the band agreed to take a break. But at some point the other members decided they wanted to continue doing concerts because the money was too good to pass up. Randy stated they asked him to tour with them but he was working on another project and had to decline. The others then chose to go on as BTO without him. In the second explanation, the other members (particularly Robbie and Blair) have maintained that Randy quit.

Trial by Fire era (1991–2005)
Randy Bachman was replaced by Randy Murray after his last departure from the band in late 1991. (Murray had been in Tim Bachman's 1987–88 touring incarnations of BTO.) This reconstituted version of BTO (Murray with Robbie Bachman, Fred Turner and Blair Thornton) proved to be its most enduring as they toured together from 1991 until December 2004. Trial by Fire: Greatest and Latest was released in 1996 and was their last album to contain any new material.

The sibling rivalry between Robbie and Randy that had started with the 1984 reunion album continued during this era. Said Randy in a 1999 interview, "They said, 'We'll just call ourselves BTO. People will know you're not there.' The problem is when BTO pulls into town, the radio, the press people, call them Bachman-Turner Overdrive. It's like Coke and Coca-Cola, two names that go hand in hand. It kind of gets represented that I'm there and when they play the gig, I clearly am not there. [And] they've got another guy to take my place who unfortunately is named Randy. So there's this inference that I'm there and I'm not there, which is a disservice to the fans." Replied brother Robbie, "Randy Murray doesn't fill anyone's shoes. He brings his own."

In 2003, the Canadian Music Hall of Fame voted to induct Bachman–Turner Overdrive into the museum. However, the band would have had to play as the Not Fragile line-up, meaning the inclusion of Randy Bachman to the band for that performance. The current version of BTO at the time declined the invitation unless they could be inducted as "BTO" without Randy Bachman playing on stage. The Hall refused and the band was not inducted. (The "classic" lineup of Randy Bachman, Fred Turner, Blair Thornton and Robbie Bachman would eventually be inducted - by astronaut Chris Hadfield - in 2014.)

In an interview in 2004, Rob Bachman had stated that BTO was working on nine or ten new songs. It has been reported from numerous sources that the band could not get a good label to release the project and wanted this album to be distributed and publicized well, unlike what happened to the Trial by Fire CD. There was also a plan to release a live DVD/CD from a show in 2003 in their hometown of Winnipeg, but thus far this has not happened.

Hiatus 2005–2009
Since the last disbandment of the band in 2005, several of their albums have been reissued. The first one to be made available again since the disbandment was Freeways in 2005, followed by Bachman–Turner Overdrive II in 2006 and Four Wheel Drive in 2008. Brave Belt I and Brave Belt II were re-released on a single CD March 17, 2009.

Although Rob and Blair remained very reticent about BTO since late 2004, Rob had been rumoured to state he no longer wished to play in the band and had hung up his drum sticks. On January 10, 2023, Robbie Bachman died at age 69.

On January 23, 2009, Tim Bachman played on stage at one of Randy Bachman's shows, the first time they had played on stage together since 2003. Randy Bachman, who already hosted the successful radio show "Randy's Vinyl Tap", was slated to be the host of a new television show called "Road to Guitar", which was set to air on the Discovery Channel. He was on tour with Burton Cummings during the summer of 2009, and played dates for the Randy Bachman Band in the United States and Canada for August and September.

Throughout his tenure in BTO and up until 2017, Randy Murray played bar gigs and casuals around the Vancouver area. He began working in Anglican Church communications in 2002. He is currently the Communications Officer of the Anglican Diocese of New Westminster. He retired from music in 2017. He is the only Trial by Fire–era member of BTO, besides Fred Turner, to have played shows after the disbandment in January 2005. Like Rob, Murray has also stated he no longer wishes to be in BTO.

Bachman and Turner reunion 2009–2018

Due to the intense interest in a Bachman-Turner reunion, Randy Bachman and Fred Turner announced their reteaming on December 8, 2009, in their hometown of Winnipeg.

Information on the 2010 Bachman & Turner tour and the new album was provided at their then-new website bachmanandturner.com. As Randy wrote on the site, the project started with his request to Turner that he sing lead on the song, "Rock 'n Roll Is the Only Way Out". But after hearing the track with Turner's vocals, Randy asked if his former bandmate could contribute more vocals and some original compositions and offered to put his solo project on hold in favour of a Bachman-Turner album. It morphed into a full-blown collaboration.

On September 12, 2009, the Winnipeg Free Press had already reported that Randy Bachman and C.F. Turner would reunite to play concert dates in Europe, Canada and the US in 2010 backed by Randy's current band of Marc LaFrance, Mick Dalla-Vee and Brent Howard, billed simply as Bachman & Turner. Some early confirmed tour dates announced were June 2010 at the Sweden Rock Festival and the High Voltage Festival in July 2010 at London UK; the story added that there was also interest from agents as far away as South America and Australia.

The tour and album plans of 'Bachman & Turner' resulted in a lawsuit by Rob Bachman and Blair Thornton regarding ownership of the band name and related trademarks. Rob Bachman and Blair Thornton claim that US and Canadian rights in the BTO name and trademark were transferred to Rob Bachman, Blair Thornton and Fred Turner when Randy Bachman commenced a solo career in 1977.It is unclear whether this claim relates to both "Bachman-Turner Overdrive" and "BTO", or solely the latter. Randy Bachman is said to have registered the names "Bachman-Turner", "BTU", "Bachman-Turner United" and "Bachman-Turner Union" in both the United States and Canada. These names are said to cause confusion with the names "Bachman-Turner Overdrive" and "BTO", resulting in potential damages to Rob Bachman and Blair Thornton. There appeared to be general legal agreement that one could perform under one's own legal names such as "Bachman & Turner", so the newly reunited pair were billed as such for the 2010 tour and album.  The band played the halftime show at the 2010 Grey Cup in Edmonton.

The rock duo's self-titled album, Bachman & Turner, was released September 7, 2010 in North America and on September 20, 2010, in Europe.  In November 2010, they performed at the famous Roseland Ballroom in New York City as part of their North American tour. A double live album (Live at the Roseland Ballroom, NYC) was recorded at that show, which was also filmed and will be released on DVD and Blu-ray later in the year. / Line-up:
Randy Bachman (guitars, vocals); C.F. Turner (bass, vocals); Marc LaFrance (drums, percussion, vocals); Brent Howard Knudsen (guitars, vocals); Mick Dalla-Vee (guitars, vocals).

Capitalizing on the recent Bachman & Turner album and supporting shows, BTO released another compilation set in 2013: Bachman–Turner Overdrive: 40th Anniversary.  It has 26 songs on two CDs. Much of the collection had been released before, but there were four previously unreleased songs, including "Rough Ride" from the 1984 BTO reunion album sessions and "West Coast Turnaround" from the 1975 Head On sessions. The CD set also features one Brave Belt song ("Never Comin' Home"), and eight songs on disc two are from the long out-of-print B.T.O. Live – Japan Tour album from 1976. Disc two also adds live versions of "Blue Collar" and "Give It Time", recorded at the same Japan concerts but not released on the vinyl edition. On March 10, 2018, Randy Bachman announced that Fred Turner would be retiring from touring.

Impact and influence
BTO has been recognized in many music circles for carrying on the torch of guitar-heavy rock and roll at a time when soft rock was dominating the Top 40 charts, and progressive and glam acts were getting an increasing share of FM radio play. As drummer Rob Bachman put it: "We were basically fans of all kinds of music, but really liked the old kind of rock-and-roll...like Elvis and the funky kinds of rock bands like The Stones. Luckily for us, Creedence had just called it quits, and we came out with three- and four-chord rock-and-roll with Fred Turner's gruff voice. So it was basically this working man's kind of rock-and-roll."

A reviewer assesses, however, that critics are divided over BTO's legacy:

Stated John Einarson, author of the biography Randy Bachman: Still Takin' Care of Business, "If The Guess Who made Canadian music North American, Bachman-Turner Overdrive made it international, earning gold and platinum records not only in the US and Canada, but in Sweden, Australia, New Zealand and South Africa, among others."

After accusing BTO of "shamelessly stealing riffs from the Rolling Stones, The Doobie Brothers and anyone else who happened to be handy," Toronto Star critic Craig MacInnis acknowledged, "They knew how to put the hooks in all the right places, led by the urgent fretwork of Randy Bachman and the gravel vocal stylings of Turner, whose voice resembles a fully-revved Harley-Davidson."

Stephen King derived his Richard Bachman pen name from Bachman–Turner Overdrive when he was listening to the band's song "You Ain't Seen Nothing Yet" at the time his publisher asked him to choose a pseudonym on the spot.

The band was featured in The Simpsons episode "Saddlesore Galactica".

Randy Bachman and Fred Turner also appeared in the 2012 comedy movie The Campaign, making a cameo performing the song "Taking Care of Business".

The song "Takin' Care of Business" was also the title of a 1990 movie starring Jim Belushi as an escaped convict who wins tickets to see the Chicago Cubs in the World Series and finds the Filofax of businessman Charles Grodin. The song serves as the theme song to the movie.

The track "You Ain't Seen Nothing Yet" was featured as part of a running joke in the Harry Enfield sketch "Smashie and Nicey" in the early 1990s, with the duo playing the song to end almost every show.

The band is referenced in the 1994 novel Shoedog by George Pelecanos.

Awards and recognition and other achievements
 1974: Juno Award winner, Most Promising Group of the Year
 1975: Juno Award winner, Group of the Year
 1976: Juno Award winner, Group of the Year
 1978: Juno Award nomination, Group of the Year
 2008: Guitar Magazine, "Takin' Care of Business" rated at number 10 in top 100 most covered songs
 2014: Canadian Music Hall of Fame, Inductee

Discography

 Bachman–Turner Overdrive (1973)
 Bachman–Turner Overdrive II (1973)
 Not Fragile (1974)
 Four Wheel Drive (1975)
 Head On (1975)
 Freeways (1977)
 Street Action (1978)
 Rock n' Roll Nights (1979)
 Bachman–Turner Overdrive (1984)
 Trial by Fire: Greatest & Latest (1996)

Filmography
{| class="wikitable"
|-
!Year
!Title
|-
|1975
|1975 Road Special
|-
|1988
|88 Reunion
|-
|1995
|BTO: The Movie
|}

Personnel

Members
C. F. Turner – lead vocals, bass, rhythm guitar (1973–1979, 1983–1986, 1988–2005)
Randy Bachman – lead vocals, lead guitar (1973–1977, 1983–1986, 1988–1991)
Robbie Bachman – drums, percussion, backing vocals (1973–1979, 1988–2005; died 2023)
Tim Bachman – rhythm guitar, lead and backing vocals (1973–1974, 1983–1986)
Blair Thornton – guitar, backing vocals (1974–1979, 1988–2005)
Jim Clench – bass, lead and backing vocals (1977–1979; died 2010)
Garry Peterson – drums, backing vocals (1983–1986)
Billy Chapman – keyboards (1983–1986)
Randy Murray – guitar, lead and backing vocals (1991–2005)

Lineups
Original members in bold.

Timeline

See also

 Canadian rock
 Music of Canada
 List of Canadian musicians
 List of bands from Canada
 Sibling musical groups

References

External links
 Website for Trial by Fire version of the band
 Photographs by Bruce Andrew Peters of BTO performing in recent years – click on MUSICIANS
 The Message board that was formerly able to be accessed from the btorocks website
 Official site for Randy Bachman
 Link to the official Randy Bachman messaging board 
 
 Article at thecanadianencyclopedia.ca

 
1973 establishments in Manitoba
2004 disestablishments in Manitoba
Canadian hard rock musical groups
Juno Award for Album of the Year winners
Juno Award for Breakthrough Group of the Year winners
Juno Award for Group of the Year winners
Juno Award for Single of the Year winners
Mercury Records artists
Musical groups disestablished in 2004
Musical groups established in 1973
Musical groups from Winnipeg
MCA Records artists
Curb Records artists
Canadian Music Hall of Fame inductees